Puyehue is a commune in Chile located in Osorno Province of Los Lagos Region. It is bordered to the south by Rupanco Lake, to the east by the Andes and Argentina, to the north by Puyehue Lake and to the west by Osorno commune. Cardenal Antonio Samoré Pass that links the Los Lagos Region to Argentina lies in the eastern tip of the commune. The comune is administered by Entre Lagos, the main town in Puyehue.

Demographics
Of these, 3,932 (34.6%) lived in urban areas and 7,436 (65.4%) in rural areas. The population grew by 1.4% (161 persons) between the 1992 and 2002 censuses.

Administration
As a commune, Puyehue is a third-level administrative division of Chile administered by a municipal council, headed by an alcalde who is directly elected every four years.

Within the electoral divisions of Chile, Puyehue is represented in the Chamber of Deputies by Fidel Espinoza (PS) and Carlos Recondo (UDI) as part of the 56th electoral district, together with Río Negro, Purranque, Puerto Octay, Fresia, Frutillar, Llanquihue, Puerto Varas and Los Muermos. The commune is represented in the Senate by Camilo Escalona Medina (PS) and Carlos Kuschel Silva (RN) as part of the 17th senatorial constituency (Los Lagos Region).

References

External links
  Municipality of Puyehue

Communes of Chile
Geography of Los Lagos Region
1971 establishments in Chile